Toy Ride, Toy-Box's second album, was released on July 28, 2001, with one version of the CD containing a 2-sided, 9-piece puzzle of the cover art.

Track list

  Superstar (3:07)  
  Russian Lullaby (3:17)   
  www.girl (3:26)   
  007 (3:20)   
  Cowboy Joe (3:08)   
  Dumm-Diggy-Dumm (3:09)
  Wizard of Oz (3:20)   
  Divided (3:32)   
  Prince of Arabia (3:37)   
  S.O.S. (2:46)   
  No Sleep (3:44)   
  Finally (3:06)

Charts

References

External links
 Toy-box's site

2001 albums
Toy-Box albums
Edel Music albums